The 2018 Atlantic Championship Series season was the fifth season of the revived Atlantic Championship. The series was organised by Formula Race Promotions and sanctioned by the United States Auto Club. 17 year old Argentine driver Baltazar Leguizamon won the championship by 99 points over American Blake Mount. Leguizamon won ten of the fourteen races while Mount and Atlantics veteran Keith Grant won two races each.

Race calendar and results

References

Atlantic Championship
Atlantic Championship seasons